Declan Murphy (born 1956) is an Irish retired Gaelic footballer. His league and championship career with the Cork senior team lasted for from 1977 until 1978.

Murphy made his debut on the inter-county scene at the age of sixteen when he was selected for the Cork minor team. He enjoyed two championship seasons with the minor team, culminating with the winning of an All-Ireland medal in 1974. Murphy subsequently joined the Cork under-21, however, his three seasons on that team ended without success. By this stage he had joined the Cork senior team and made his debut during the 1978 championship.

Honours

Cork
 All-Ireland Minor Football Championship (1): 1974
 Munster Minor Football Championship (2): 1973, 1974

References

1956 births
Living people
Nemo Rangers Gaelic footballers
Cork inter-county Gaelic footballers